Egon Vůch (born 1 February 1991) is a Czech football player who currently plays for TJ Jiskra Domažlice. He has also played for the under-21 team of his country.

Career

Club
On 10 March 2018, Vůch signed for FC Shakhter Karagandy on loan from FC Tobol.

References

External links
 

1991 births
Living people
Sportspeople from Plzeň
Czech footballers
Czech expatriate footballers
Czech Republic under-21 international footballers
FK Teplice players
FC Viktoria Plzeň players
FC Slovan Liberec players
1. FK Příbram players
FC Tobol players
FK Viktoria Žižkov players
FC Shakhter Karagandy players
TJ Jiskra Domažlice players
Czech First League players
Kazakhstan Premier League players
Association football midfielders
Expatriate footballers in Kazakhstan
Czech expatriate sportspeople in Kazakhstan